Lấp Vò is a rural district (huyện) of Đồng Tháp province in the Mekong Delta region of Vietnam. As of 2003 the district had a population of 180,431. The district covers an area of 244 km². The district capital is Lấp Vò town. It borders Long Xuyên of An Giang Province at Vàm Cống ferry, one of a few full-size heavy-duty ferry services left in Mekong delta. From the Vàm Cống ferry, travelers can reach Sa Đéc by local bus.  This location is known for its unique scenery, and waterways are visible from the bus route.

Divisions
The district is divided into communes:

Lấp Vò
Mỹ An Hưng A
Mỹ An Hưng B
Tân Mỹ
Tân Khánh Trung
Long Hưng A
Long Hưng B
Vĩnh Thạnh
Hội An Đông
Bình Thạnh Trung
Định Yên
Định An
Bình Thành
Thị trấn

References

Districts of Đồng Tháp province